Kurumba is an administrative ward in Ilemela District, Mwanza Region, Tanzania. In 2016 the Tanzania National Bureau of Statistics report there were 31,656 people in the ward, from 28,103 in 2012.

Villages 
The ward has 13 villages.

 Kirumba Kati
 Ngara
 Kabohoro
 Ibanda Juu
 Ibanda Ziwani
 Mlimani
 Kigoto
 Ibanda Busisi
 Kabuhoro B
 kiyungi
 Magomeni
 Mlimani B

Notable people
 

Witness-Patchelly Kambale Musonia

References

Wards of Mwanza Region
Ilemela District
Constituencies of Tanzania